Murray Goulburn Madden Bourchier  (28 March 19253 July 1981) was an Australian public servant and diplomat.

Life and career
Bourchier joined the Commonwealth Public Service in 1951 as a cadet in the Department of External Affairs.

In August 1971 Bourchier's appointment as Australian Ambassador to the Republic of Korea was announced. He took up his appointment as head of mission in November 1971.

From 1977 to 1980 Bourchier was Australian Ambassador to the Soviet Union. Relationships between the two countries were tense during the period. In 1979 Bourchier was medically evacuated from Moscow to London where he was diagnosed with a cerebral tumour. He stepped down from his post in August 1980.

In June 1981, Bouchier was appointed an Officer in the general division of the Order of Australia in recognition of his services as a diplomatic representative.

Bourchier died at home in Deakin, Canberra, on Friday 3 July 1981.

References

1925 births
1981 deaths
Ambassadors of Australia to Mongolia
Ambassadors of Australia to South Korea
Ambassadors of Australia to the Soviet Union
High Commissioners of Australia to Ghana
Officers of the Order of Australia
University of Melbourne alumni